Shahwar Ali is an Indian actor and model who appears primarily in Bollywood, Tollywood and Sandalwood films.

Early life and career 
Sarwar Ali was born and raised in Bhopal, Madhya Pradesh. His father was a farmer in Bhopal. He shifted to Mumbai in 2000. He worked as a ramp model for the fashion brand Calvin Klein for three months in 2002 before joining the film industry. His debut film was Asambhav released in 2004, where he acted alongside Arjun Rampal and Priyanka Chopra.

In 1998, he won an award in Mr. India under "Best Physique category".

Filmography

Films

Television
 Power Couple
 Amma (Hindi TV series)
 Mast Mauli

References

External links
 
 

Indian male film actors
Indian male models
Living people
Year of birth missing (living people)
Male actors from Bhopal
Male actors in Telugu cinema
Male actors in Hindi cinema
Male actors in Kannada cinema